The Minister of Defense is a senior member of the Constitutional Government of East Timor heading the Ministry of Defense.

Functions
Under the Constitution of East Timor, the Minister has the power and the duty:

Where the Minister is in charge of the subject matter of a government statute, the Minister is also required, together with the Prime Minister, to sign the statute.

Incumbent
The incumbent Minister of Defense is Filomeno da Paixão de Jesus.

List of Ministers 
The following individuals have been appointed as the Minister:

See also
 Timor Leste Defence Force

References

External links

  – official site  

 
Defense